"Warrin' Priests" is a two-part episode of the American animated television series The Simpsons. Part One is the 19th episode of the thirty-first season and the 681st episode overall, having originally premiered on the Fox network in the United States on April 26, 2020, Part Two is the 20th episode of the thirty-first season and the 682nd episode overall, having premiered on May 3, 2020. The title "Warrin' Priests" refers to War and Peace by Leo Tolstoy. This marks the series' third two-parter following Season 6 and 7's "Who Shot Mr. Burns?" and Season 28's "The Great Phatsby".

Both parts were written by Pete Holmes; part one was directed by Bob Anderson and part two by Matthew Nastuk. Holmes guest stars as preacher Bode Wright in both parts.

Plot

Part One
The First Church of Springfield is mostly empty as the service starts, with even the choir being late. Reverend Lovejoy unsuccessfully tries to get the congregation involved. Meanwhile, a young man named Bode Wright turns up in Springfield to apply for the job of youth minister after he saw an advert placed by Helen Lovejoy. Bode gets the job after a short interview, with Helen offering to let him stay with them, to Lovejoy's annoyance.

The next church service, Lovejoy loses his voice completely. Bode then takes over as the pastor for the service and proves a hit with everyone including even Homer, singing "Amazing Grace" and getting the congregation involved, though Ned Flanders dislikes his modern methods. As the services go on, more and more people turn up to the church, bringing the town into a full-blown religious revival, with many people turning back to religion. Lisa and Bode bond together over vegetarianism, science, Buddhism and jazz, and Bode even heals Homer and Marge's marriage problems.

The church council votes to replace Lovejoy with Bode. Lovejoy and Helen then go to Traverse City, Michigan to dig up some dirt on Bode, and while there manage to find a newspaper article that could be Bode's downfall.

Part Two
As Bode continues to brings record crowds to the church with his fresh ideas and good looks, Ned is disappointed and misses the old ways. Lisa finds that the new minister's teachings help reconcile her with the church, though Marge warns her that Springfield has been traditionally hostile to new ideas. Ned challenges Bode to a scriptural debate and loses. Meanwhile, in Michigan, Lovejoy and Helen visit the Blessed Buy Megachurch, where Bode was fired. Lovejoy asks about Bode and the preacher presents them a USB drive with proof about Bode.

During the ceremony at the church, Lovejoy returns announcing what he found in Michigan: the reason Bode was fired was that as a 19-year-old minister, he burned a Bible during a church service. The next Tuesday, Lisa presents the debate between the two priests, but the Springfielders do not forgive the new minister and Bode resigns.

At church, before Bode leaves Springfield, Lisa asks him why he burned the Bible. He says that God is in the heart, not in a cathedral or a book, a subtext Lisa points out that the townspeople do not understand.

Reception
Dennis Perkins from The A.V. Club gave Part One of the episode a B+, stating "Holmes himself plays Bode, the guitar-strumming young pastor who's come to Springfield at the behest of not Reverend Lovejoy (of the interminably sleepy sermons and defensive moralizing), but wife Helen. (She put an ad for help on "Christ's List.")."

Tony Sokol of Den of Geek gave Part Two a 4 out of 5, stating "'Warrin' Priests' is a parable. Springfield is America. The majority of people are as desperate for change as they are desperately afraid of it. The episode is a testament to longer-form Simpsons. The series gets more adventurous, allows more attention to details, develops supporting personalities and lets the tensions grow. It almost felt like this episode could've used another full segment."

References

External links

The Simpsons (season 31) episodes
2020 American television episodes
Television episodes about religion